Mongin is a surname of Roman origin. Notable people with the surname include:

Sam Mongin (1884–1936), American baseball player 
Willie Mongin, Malaysian politician

References

French-language surnames
Surnames of Italian origin